The Martin River is a stream on the Kenai Peninsula in the U.S. state of Alaska. Beginning at Portlock Glacier in the Kenai Mountains, it flows north for  into Kachemak Bay. The upper river lies within Kenai National Wildlife Refuge.

See also
List of rivers of Alaska

References

Rivers of the Kenai Peninsula
Rivers of Kenai Peninsula Borough, Alaska
Rivers of Alaska